The 1931 Rhode Island Rams football team was an American football team that represented Rhode Island State College (later renamed the University of Rhode Island) as a member of the New England Conference during the 1931 college football season. In its 12th season under head coach Frank Keaney, the team compiled a 4–4 record (2–0 against conference opponents) and tied with New Hampshire for the conference championship.

Schedule

References

Rhode Island State
Rhode Island Rams football seasons
Rhode Island State Rams football